Amblyseius parasundi is a species of mite in the family Phytoseiidae.

References

parasundi
Articles created by Qbugbot
Animals described in 1974